Elena Mirela Lavric (born 17 February 1991, in Pungești) is a Romanian athlete who specializes in the 800 metres. Her personal best time is 1:59.74 in Hengelo.  She competed for Romania at the 2012 Summer Olympics.

Competition record

References

Lavric adds World Junior gold to World Youth title. IAAF.org. 11 July 2008.

External links

1991 births
Living people
Romanian female middle-distance runners
Athletes (track and field) at the 2012 Summer Olympics
Olympic athletes of Romania
World Athletics Indoor Championships medalists

People from Vaslui County